Social law is an unified concept of law, which replaces the classical division of public law and private law. The term has both been used to mean fields of law that fall between "core" private and public subjects, such as corporate law, competition law, labour law and social security, or as a unified concept for the whole of the law based on associations.

In reaction to classical jurisprudence in the 19th century, legal scholars questioned a rigid divide between private law and public law. The German legal philosopher, Otto von Gierke worked to develop a comprehensive history and theory of "social law" (Soziales Recht). Key tenets of Gierke's work were adopted and brought into English jurisprudence by Frederick W. Maitland. In France, Léon Duguit developed the concept of social law in his 1911 book, Le droit social, le droit individuel et la transformation de l’état. A common thread has been an attachment to social justice in a democratic society. This became central to the thinking of American legal realists during the Lochner era of the early 20th century.

See also
Legal philosophy
Sociology of law
Private law and public law
Law
Natural law

Notes

References
Otto von Gierke, The Social Role of Private Law (2016) translated and introduced by E McGaughey, originally Die soziale Aufgabe des Privatrechts (Berlin 1889) 
Léon Duguit, Le droit social, le droit individuel et la transformation de l’état (1911)
Max Weber, Economy and Society (1922) translation edited by G Roth and C Wittich (1978) vol II, ch IX, viii, 886
Hugo Sinzheimer, 'Chronik von Juni 1929' in T Ramm, Die Justiz. Einer Chronik (1968) 180
G Gurvitch, 'The Problem of Social Law' (1941) 52(1) Ethics 17
Gunther Teubner, Juridification of Social Spheres: A Comparative Analysis in the Areas of Labor, Corporate, Antitrust and Social Welfare Law (1987)
G Gurvitch, L’idee du droit social (1932), G Radbruch, Der Mensch im Recht (1957)
D Grimm, Solidarität als Rechtsprinzip (1973)
A Seifert, ‘Von der Person zum Menschen im Recht - zum Begriff des sozialen Rechts bei Hugo Sinzheimer’ (2011) 1(2) Soziales Recht 62
E Eichenhofer, ‘Soziales Recht - Bemerkungen zur Begriffsgeschichte’ (2012) 2(2) Soziales Recht 76
Ruth Dukes, The Labour Constitution: The Enduring Idea of Labour Law (2014) 15-16

External links
Website for the German Soziales Recht Journal, and on Jstor

 
Law